Nirvana was an American rock band formed by singer and guitarist Kurt Cobain and bassist Krist Novoselic in Aberdeen, Washington in 1987, with drummer Dave Grohl joining the band in 1990.

The band recorded three studio albums; Bleach, Nevermind and In Utero, with other songs available on live albums, compilations, extended plays (EPs), singles and reissues. Other songs have surfaced or are known to exist but have not been released officially.

Songs

See also 
Nirvana discography
Nirvana bootleg recordings

Notes

References

Bibliography

–. 

Songs recorded by Nirvana
Nirvana